HAMMER is a high-availability 64-bit file system developed by Matthew Dillon for DragonFly BSD using B+ trees. Its major features include infinite NFS-exportable snapshots, master–multislave operation, configurable history retention, fsckless-mount, and checksums to deal with data corruption. HAMMER also supports data block deduplication, meaning that identical data blocks will be stored only once on a file system. A successor, HAMMER2, was announced in 2011 and became the default in Dragonfly 5.2 (April 2018).

Features 
HAMMER file system provides configurable fine-grained and coarse-grained filesystem histories with online snapshots availability. Up to 65536 master (read–write) and slave (read-only) pseudo file systems (PFSs), with independent individual retention parameters and inode numbering, may be created for each file system; PFS may be mirrored to multiple slaves both locally or over network connection with near real-time performance. No file system checking is required on remount.

HAMMER supports volumes up to 1 EiB of storage capacity. File system supports CRC checksumming of data and metadata, online layout correction and data deduplication, and dynamic inodes allocation with effectively unlimited number of inodes.

Limitations 
Currently, regular maintenance is required to keep the file system clean and regain space after file deletions. By default, a cron job performs the necessary actions on DragonFly BSD daily. HAMMER does not support multi-master configurations.

Performance 
HAMMER is optimized to reduce the number of physical I/O operations to cover the most likely path, ensuring sequential access for optimal performance.

The following performance-related improvements were introduced in :
 Increased disk read speed in certain scenarios by implementing pulse-width modulated time-domain multiplexer on B-tree cursor operation
 Removed a deadlock stalling issue
 Improved read performance during heavy, concurrent file write operations

Development 

HAMMER was developed specifically for DragonFly BSD to provide a feature-rich yet better designed analogue of the then increasingly popular ZFS.

HAMMER was declared production-ready with DragonFly 2.2 in 2009; in 2012, design-level work shifted onto HAMMER2, which was declared stable with DragonFly 5.2 in 2018.

, HAMMER is now often referred to as HAMMER1 to avoid confusion with HAMMER2, although an official renaming has not happened. Both filesystems are independent of each other due to different on-disk formats, and continue to receive separate updates and improvements independently.

See also 

 Comparison of file systems
 List of file systems
 HAMMER2
 ZFS
 Btrfs
 OpenZFS

References

External links 
 

DragonFly BSD
Distributed file systems
2008 software